Valentyn is a given name. Notable people with the name include:

 Valentyn Demyanenko, Ukrainian sprint canoeist
 Valentyn Grekov (born 1976), Ukrainian judoka
 Valentyn Kravchuk (born 1944), Ukrainian rower
 Valentyn Koronevsky (born 1950), Ukrainian economist and politician
 Valentyn Poltavets, (born 1968), Ukrainian football midfielder
 Valentyn Rechmedin (1916–1986) Ukrainian journalist and writer
 Valentyn Slyusar, Ukrainian football midfielder
 Valentyn Symonenko (born 1940), Ukrainian statesman

Ukrainian masculine given names